Christian Bull (born 13 August 1996) is a Norwegian professional ice hockey player who is currently playing for Pioneers Vorarlberg of the ICE Hockey League (ICEHL).

Bull competed in the 2018 IIHF World Championship as a member of the Norway men's national ice hockey team.

Career statistics

Regular season and playoffs

International

References

External links

1996 births
Living people
IF Björklöven players
Krefeld Pinguine players
Lillehammer IK players
Norwegian ice hockey defencemen
Norwegian expatriate ice hockey people
Norwegian expatriate sportspeople in Sweden
Ice hockey people from Oslo
Storhamar Dragons players
HC Nové Zámky players
Expatriate ice hockey players in Sweden
Norwegian expatriate sportspeople in Slovakia
Expatriate ice hockey players in Slovakia
Norwegian expatriate sportspeople in Germany
Norwegian expatriate sportspeople in Austria
Expatriate ice hockey players in Austria
Expatriate ice hockey players in Germany